Pierre-Luc Yao (born November 4, 1982) is a former professional Canadian football running back. He played five years of CIS football for the Laval Rouge et Or and won the Vanier Cup three times (2003, 2004, 2006). In 2008, Yao was signed by the Edmonton Eskimos as an undrafted free agent. He played the 18 games of the 2008 with the special teams and registered 8 tackles. He was released by the Eskimos prior to the 2009 season.

References

1982 births
Canadian football running backs
Edmonton Elks players
French Quebecers
Laval Rouge et Or football players
Living people
Sportspeople from Quebec City
Players of Canadian football from Quebec